The Union des industries et métiers de la métallurgie (Union of Metallurgies Industries or UIMM) is the largest sub-federation of the Mouvement des Entreprises de France (MEDEF), the French largest union of employers.

Its current president is Frédéric Saint-Geours, who was elected 20 December 2007.

History

See also 
Union of Industrial and Employers' Confederations of Europe (UNICE)
Mouvement des Entreprises de France (MEDEF)

References

External links
Official site of the UIMM

Trade associations based in France
Employers' organizations